The Seattle Institute of East Asian Medicine (SIEAM, formerly the Seattle Institute of Oriental Medicine) is a private graduate college in Seattle, Washington. It is accredited by the Accreditation Commission for Acupuncture and Oriental Medicine and authorized by the Washington Higher Education Coordinating Board to award the degrees of Master of Acupuncture and Oriental Medicine, Master of Acupuncture, and Doctor of Acupuncture and Herbal Medicine. SIEAM's educational programs offer training in acupuncture, tui na, shiatsu, Chinese herbal medicine, and Chinese medical language.

SIEAM operates a teaching clinic and herbal dispensary where graduate students both observe faculty practitioners and practice under faculty supervisors.

References

External links
Official website

Acupuncture organizations
Universities and colleges in Seattle
Educational institutions established in 1996
Alternative medicine organizations
1996 establishments in Washington (state)